Chaudhry Muhammad Barjees Tahir (born 20 April 1948) is a Pakistani politician who has been a member of the National Assembly of Pakistan since August 2018. Previously, he was a member of the National Assembly between 1990 and May 2018.

He served as Minister for Kashmir Affairs and Gilgit Baltistan in the Abbasi cabinet from August 2017 to May 2018. Previously he served as the Minister of Kashmir Affairs and Gilgit Baltistan. A member of Pakistan Muslim League (Nawaz), Tahir briefly served as Governor of Gilgit–Baltistan in 2015.

Early life and education
He was born on 20 April 1949.

He graduated with masters in Law and Political Science from University of Punjab in Lahore.

Political career
Tahir was elected as a member of the National Assembly of Pakistan in 1990 Pakistani general election for the first time. He was re-elected to the National Assembly of Pakistan in 1993 Pakistani general election. From 1990 to 1993, he served as federal parliamentary secretary in the Ministry of Interior during Nawaz Sharif first government in 1990. He was re-elected as member of the National Assembly in 1993 Pakistani general election, and again in 1997 Pakistani general election. After the overthrow of the Pakistan Muslim League (N) government in 1999 in a coup de'tat by Pervez Musharraf, he was arrested. He was re-elected member of National Assembly in 2008 Pakistani general election.

After winning National Assembly seat in 2013 Pakistani general election. he was made Minister of Kashmir Affairs and Northern Areas. In February 2015, he was appointed Minister for Kashmir Affairs and Gilgit-Baltistan as Governor of Gilgit-Baltistan. He had ceased to hold ministerial office in July 2017 when the federal cabinet was disbanded following the resignation of Prime Minister Nawaz Sharif after Panama Papers case decision.

Following the election of Shahid Khaqan Abbasi as Prime Minister of Pakistan in August 2017, he was inducted into the federal cabinet of Abbasi. He was appointed as the Federal Minister of Kashmir Affairs and Gilgit Baltistan. Upon the dissolution of the National Assembly on the expiration of its term on 31 May 2018, Tahir ceased to hold the office as Federal Minister for Kashmir Affairs and Gilgit-Baltistan.

He was re-elected to the National Assembly as a candidate of PML-N from Constituency NA-117 (Nankana Sahib-I) in 2018 Pakistani general election.

References

Living people
1949 births
Pakistani lawyers
Pakistani prisoners and detainees
Pakistani MNAs 1990–1993
Pakistani MNAs 1993–1996
Pakistani MNAs 1997–1999
Pakistani MNAs 2008–2013
Pakistani MNAs 2013–2018
Pakistan Muslim League (N) MNAs
Government ministers of Pakistan
Governors of Gilgit-Baltistan
People from Nankana Sahib District
University of the Punjab alumni
Pakistani MNAs 2018–2023